Fabienne Shine is a French and Jewish model, actress and musician, born in Tunisia, North Africa in 1944 and raised in Paris.

She started writing songs and composing her own music at an early age. She went travelled the world with her guitar and met the band Led Zeppelin, who liked her songs. Jimmy Page got involved romantically with her. Robert Plant and Page often jammed with her and finally suggested that she should create a band.

After touring the U.S. with Led Zeppelin, she went back to Europe and met a young guitarist, Eric Levi, at a concert in Paris. They decided to start a band in 1975, Shakin' Street (first named Speedball).  
They were exposed to the press and signed a contract with CBS France and Columbia Records USA. The band had gathered musicians like Louis Bertignac (lead guitar) and Corinne Marienneau (bass guitar), who would later join the French rock band, Téléphone.

In 1978 they signed with CBS France and recorded their first album, Vampire Rock, and in 1979 recorded their second album, Solid As A Rock, in New York and San Francisco with Columbia record producer Sandy Pearlman, known for creating the band Blue Öyster Cult. New York guitarist Ross Friedman, aka Ross the Boss, formerly of The Dictators, joined Shakin' Street as lead guitarist.

In 1980, she met Damon Edge of post-punk/industrial band Chrome; they married two months later. She went on to collaborate with Edge on several Chrome albums; her vocals appear on the album 3rd from the Sun. In 1983, Edge moved to Paris to be with her, but the couple separated several years later. Edge died in 1995.

Shine released her autobiography in 2014, Sexe, Drogues & Rock'n'roll, co-written with French rock critic Jean-Eric Perrin.

Discography

with Shakin' Street
 Vampire Rock (1978) 
 Shakin' Street (1980)
 21st Century Love Channel (2009)
 Psychic (2014)

Solo
 No Mad Nomad (1997)
 Fabienne Shine and the Planets (2007)
 ''Fabienne Shine (2018) Don't Tell Me How to Shake It

Selected filmography

References

External links
 
 

Living people
French rock singers
French women singers
Tunisian emigrants to France
1944 births